Anatole A. Klyosov (born 20 November 1946 in Chernyakhovsk) is a Russian scientist who worked in the fields of physical chemistry, enzyme catalysis, and industrial biochemistry. In 1989 Klyosov immigrated to the US.  He spent most of his career developing ways to use enzymes to convert agricultural waste products into useful products — first to convert cotton waste to glucose in the USSR, and later in the US, turning paper mill waste into useful products.  He later helped found a company, and later joined it as CSO, that was founded to use enzymes to alter existing anticancer drugs via glycosylation. In 2008 he began publishing work on DNA genealogy.

Career 
Klyosov earned Ph.D. and D.Sc. degrees in physical chemistry, and an M.S. degree in enzyme kinetics, from Moscow State University.  In the late 1970s he worked at Harvard University; he was offered a contract to keep working there but the USSR government would not allow him to take it and he remained in the USSR. From 1979 to 1981 he was professor in the department of chemical enzymology at Moscow State University.

From 1981 to 1990, he was professor and head of the Carbohydrates Research Laboratory at the A.N. Bach Institute of Biochemistry, USSR Academy of Sciences.  In the winter of 1982/1983 he became the first person behind the Iron Curtain who was allowed by the government of the USSR to use the computer network that later became the Internet, in order for him to represent the USSR in a conference hosted on the network; he used an x.25-connected computer at a Moscow institute called VNIIPAS.  He said that he developed methods to use enzymes to convert cotton plant waste products into glucose and by 1983 a pilot plant had been built in the USSR to test these methods.  He was awarded top Russian prizes in science and technology field: the Lenin Komsomol Prize in 1978 and the USSR State Prize in 1984. In 1989 he was made a fellow of the World Academy of Art and Science. In 2014 he became Foreign Member of the National Academy of Sciences of Georgia.

Klyosov immigrated to the US in 1989 after Mikhail Gorbachev came to power, and from 1990 to 1998 he was a visiting professor of biochemistry at the Center for Biochemical and Biophysical Sciences at Harvard Medical School.

In 1991 he started a consulting business called MIR International.

From 1996 to 2006 Klyosov worked at a subsidiary of Kadant, where he applied enzymology to processing of waste products from the paper-making industry, and following advice from a friend in the plastics industry, helped create a business that used cellulose granules as filler material for plastic composite products.

In 2001 he helped found Pro-Pharmaceuticals, a company that was formed to use enzymes to add carbodydrates to existing cancer drugs to make them work better, and was caught up in scandal in 2004 when the company's investors accused its CEO of misrepresenting his role in the company.  He joined the company as Chief Scientific Officer in 2006.  Pro-Pharmaceuticals named a new CEO in March 2011, and gave Klyosov a one-year contract to continue as CSO the same month.  The company was renamed as Galectin Therapeutics in May 2011. He then became a member of the company's scientific advisory board.

From 2008 Klyosov is also known as the author of what he calls "DNA genealogy" and "new science", aimed to synthesize biology, anthropology, archaeology and linguistics and to implement methods of chemical kinetics in genetics. Klyosov described his "DNA genealogy" as a "patriotic science" and between 2010 and 2016 published 10 books in this field. In some of his writings Klyosov tried to refute the Out of Africa hypothesis and proposed his alternative Into Africa theory with "outlandish claims" that the human species originated in Northern Russia. A 2015 open letter from scientists in various fields said that his writing could fuel hatred  “attracting readers whose nationalist and political ambitions are not satisfied with the world’s scientific body of knowledge.” Klyosov responded saying that they were members of a "fifth column". "DNA genealogy" has been described as pseudoscience and "DNA demagoguery”.

Klyosov is the founder and president of the Academy of DNA Genealogy and self-publishes its proceedings via Lulu.

In 2013 Klyosov became editor-in-chief of the journal Advances in Anthropology, published by Scientific Research Publishing.

Publications

Books in English 
  (Translated to Chinese, Science Press, China, 2010; translated to Russian, НОТ Publishing House, 2010, 736 с.)

Books in Russian

Enzymology

Publications on "DNA genealogy"

References

External links 
Klyosov's home page
 One of Russia's First Internet Users Recalls the Thrill

1946 births
Living people
People from Chernyakhovsk
Russian genealogists
Russian physical chemists
Pseudohistorians
Moscow State University alumni
Academic staff of Moscow State University
Recipients of the USSR State Prize
Recipients of the Lenin Komsomol Prize